"Isolation" is a song by English rock band Joy Division. It appears on their second and final album Closer. The song is based on an electronic drum beat by Stephen Morris, accompanied by a thin, trebly keyboard part by Bernard Sumner. Midway through the song, a rushing drum and hi-hat motif come in, propelling the song toward its dramatic end.

Composition
"Isolation" is a song which contains elements of synth-pop and electronic music that lasts for a duration of two minutes and fifty-two seconds. According to the sheet music published at Musicnotes.com by Universal Music Publishing Group, it is written in the time signature of common time, with a  tempo of 148 beats per minute. "Isolation" is played in the key of C major, while Ian Curtis's vocal range spans one octave, from the low-note of B3 to the high-note of B4. The song has a basic sequence of G–F–G in the verses, changes to B–A–G–F–G at the chorus and follows G–F–G–G–G during the outro as its chord progression. 

The song harbors atypical song structure and vocal delivery. Its musical arrangement employs a false ending where the band abruptly ceases, only for the recording to suddenly return with noisy feedback of a snippet before coming to a blunt end. "Isolation" is built on harsh electronic drums and a rolling, stabbing bassline. In place of a guitar melody, a cascading high-pitched synth line runs throughout the entire composition as its driving instrument. Curtis sings poetic lyrics that illustrate an abstract portrait of the titular subject. According to critic Ned Raggett, the "chilling" vocal lines express a sense of a connection and yearning after the impossible: "But if you could just see the beauty, these things I could never describe."

Bassist Peter Hook said the ending came as the serendipitous result of Martin Hannett's efforts to rescue the original master tape from a botched edit by a junior sound engineer.

Critical reception
AllMusic's Ned Raggett complimented "Isolation," writing, "the song structure and delivery is all Joy Division and as such makes the song an intriguing twist on a style and a highlight of the excellent Closer album."

Personnel
 Ian Curtis - lead vocals
 Bernard Sumner - synthesizer
 Peter Hook - bass guitar
 Stephen Morris - electronic drums

Covers
The song has been covered many times, including vesrions by:
New Order played an electronic-based cover in a Peel Session in 1998, released in the In Session compilation (2004).
Northern Irish alternative metal band Therapy? covered the song on their 1994 album Troublegum. This version also incorporates elements from Atrocity Exhibition.
In 1995, a cover by The Smashing Pumpkins spin-off band Starchildren appeared on the tribute album A Means to an End: The Music of Joy Division.
Industrial band Dessau released the Al Jourgensen produced 12" single in late 1988.
April 26, 2020, Canadian rock band The Tea Party released a newly recorded cover to coincide with the COVID-19 pandemic and the isolation orders that much of the world is under to stop the spread of the virus.
May 18, 2020, Mark Lanegan and Cold Cave release their cover of the song.

References

Sources

 Curtis, Deborah. "Touching from a Distance: Ian Curtis and Joy Division". London: Faber and Faber, 2005.  
 Hook, Peter. "Unknown Pleasures: Inside Joy Division". London: Simon & Schuster, 2012.  
 Bernard, Sumner. "Chapter and Verse - New Order, Joy Division and Me". Corgi, 2015.  

1980 songs
Joy Division songs
Songs about loneliness
Songs written by Bernard Sumner
Songs written by Peter Hook
Songs written by Stephen Morris (musician)
Songs written by Ian Curtis